Los Morales (Lit: The Morales / English: Dynasty) and stylized onscreen as Los Morales, lo que se hereda, se canta, is a Colombian biographical telenovela based on the life of the famous Colombian singers, father and son duo Kaleth and Miguel Morales and produced by Luis Alberto Restrepo for Caracol Televisión. It is known in other countries as La Dinastía and stylized as La Dinastía, cuando canta el corazón and in English as Dynasty, When the Heart Sings. It stars Julio Meza, María Laura Quintero and Jerónimo Cantillo as the Morales family. The series follows the problems of love of Miguel and Kaleth and its difficult situation to become known throughout Colombia as singers.

Plot 
The series narrates the history of the singer and composer of vallenato Kaleth Morales. From childhood he began his musical career, which was influenced by the artistic and musical career of his parents. Years later, as an adult, he rose to fame with the release of several important albums and singles, which is why he was recognized nationally in his short career, passing the sentimental relationships he obtained throughout his life And finally his death event.

Cast

Main 
 Julio Meza as Miguel Morales: He is a sinner with dreams of a well-known businessman, Nevis's husband and Kaleth's father.
 María Laura Quintero as Nevis Troya: She is a young woman from Chimichagua, wife of Miguel and mother of Kaleth.
 Jerónimo Cantillo as Kaleth Morales: He is the son of Miguel and Nevis, his dreams are to be vallenato singer.
 Vivian Ossa as July Cuello: She is the daughter of Carmelo and the bride of Kaleth.
 Édgar Vittorino as Carmelo Cuello: He is the main enemy of the family Morales, father of July.
 Adriana Ricardo as Anabel: She is the mother of Carmelo and the lover of Pedro.
 Mariane Schaller as Dionisia Araujo: She is the godmother of Nevis.
 Obeida Benavides as Abuela Morales: She is the mother of Pedro and the grandmother of Miguel.
 Yuldor Gutiérrez as Pedro Miguel Morales: He is Miguel's father and Anabel's lover.
 Jeymmy Vargas as Evelti Morales: She is the elder sister of Michael and the aunt of Kaleth.
 Christian Better as Pimiento: He is one of Miguel Morales' best friends.
 Yorneis García as El Pote Daza: He is the one that sponsors the most recognized singers.
 Marianny Egurrola as Monserrat Troya: She is the sister of Nevis, she has a son and her husband.
 Pillao Rodriguez as Sasa: He is the love rival of Kaleth Morales

Recurring 
 Sunamy Rodríguez as Ninfa López: She is the daughter of Nereo.
 John Bolivar as Nereo López: He is Miguel's boss and Ninfa's father.
 Daniel Moreno as Kanner Morales: He is the brother of Kaleth.
 Junior Polo as Keyner Morales: He is the brother of Kaleth.
 Alberto Kammerer as Young Kaleth Morales
 María Nela Sinisterra as Marlyn

Production 
The series had been proposed in 2015 for RCN Televisión, but this company rejected it. Later in the same year Caracol Televisión had acquired the authorization of the family of Kaleth Morales to start the production of the series. At the beginning of 2016 more than 370 actors attended the casting to look for the cast. The filming of the series took place in municipalities near Valledupar, such as San Juan del Cesar. There were also locations in Cartagena, Barranquilla and Bogota.

Reception 
The series premiered without advertisements commercial occupying the second place like the program more seen of the Colombian television in the schedule of the 9 of the night. Its average premiere a total of 12.8 million viewers, even so I can not overcome the competition program Yo me llamo, who took the first place as the most watched Colombian television program.

Episodes

Ratings 
 
}}

Awards and nominations

References 

Colombian telenovelas
Spanish-language telenovelas
Caracol Televisión telenovelas
2017 telenovelas
2017 Colombian television series debuts
2017 Colombian television series endings
Television series set in the 2000s
Television series based on singers and musicians
Television shows set in Cartagena, Colombia